The men's team foil was one of eight fencing events on the fencing at the 1988 Summer Olympics programme. It was the seventeenth appearance of the event. The competition was held from 26 to 27 September 1988. 76 fencers from 16 nations competed.

Rosters

Canada
 Stephen Angers
 Benoît Giasson
 Danek Nowosielski
 Luc Rocheleau

China
 Lao Shaopei
 Liu Yunhong
 Ye Chong
 Zhang Zhicheng

East Germany
 Aris Enkelmann
 Adrian Germanus
 Jens Gusek
 Jens Howe
 Udo Wagner

France
 Laurent Bel
 Patrick Groc
 Youssef Hocine
 Patrice Lhotellier
 Philippe Omnès

Great Britain
 Tony Bartlett
 Jonathan Davis
 Bill Gosbee
 Pierre Harper
 Donnie McKenzie

Hong Kong
 Choy Kam Shing
 Lee Chung Man
 Tong King King
 Weng Tak Fung

Hungary
 Zsolt Érsek
 Pál Szekeres
 István Szelei
 István Busa
 Róbert Gátai

Italy
 Andrea Borella
 Stefano Cerioni
 Federico Cervi
 Andrea Cipressa
 Mauro Numa

Japan
 Matsuo Azuma
 Harunobu Deno
 Koji Emura
 Yoshihiko Kanatsu
 Kenichi Umezawa

Kuwait
 Khaled Al-Awadhi
 Faisal Al-Harshani
 Saqer Al-Surayei
 Salman Mohamed

Poland
 Leszek Bandach
 Waldemar Ciesielczyk
 Piotr Kiełpikowski
 Marian Sypniewski
 Bogusław Zych

South Korea
 Hong Yeong-Seung
 Kim Seung-Pyo
 Kim Yong-Guk
 Go Nak-Chun
 Lee Yeong-Rok

Soviet Union
 Aleksandr Romankov
 Ilgar Mammadov
 Vladimer Aptsiauri
 Anvar Ibragimov
 Boris Koretsky

Sweden
 Peter Åkerberg
 Thomas Åkerberg
 Ola Kajbjer
 Eric Strand
 Per Täckenström

United States
 Peter Lewison
 Dave Littell
 Mike Marx
 Greg Massialas
 George Nonomura

West Germany
 Matthias Gey
 Thorsten Weidner
 Matthias Behr
 Ulrich Schreck
 Thomas Endres

Results

Round 1

Round 1 Pool A 

In the first set of matches, East Germany beat Kuwait 9–0 and China defeated Great Britain 9–7. The second set saw the winners both win again (securing advancement) and the losers both lose again (resulting in elimination), as East Germany prevailed over Great Britain 9–2 and China won against Kuwait 9–3. Finally, East Germany took the top spot in the group by beating China 9–5 while Kuwait finished last after losing to Great Britain 9–5.

Round 1 Pool B 

In the first set of matches, the Soviet Union beat Hong Kong 9–0 and Poland defeated Canada 9–2. The second set saw the winners both win again (securing advancement) and the losers both lose again (resulting in elimination), as the Soviet Union prevailed over Canada 9–1 and Poland won against Hong Kong 9–0. Finally, the Soviet Union took the top spot in the group by beating Poland 9–3 while Hong Kong finished last after losing to Canada 9–1.

Round 1 Pool C 

In the first set of matches, France beat the United States 9–3 and West Germany defeated Sweden 9–0. The second set saw the winners both win again (securing advancement) and the losers both lose again (resulting in elimination), as France prevailed over Sweden 9–3 and West Germany won against the United States 9–4. Finally, France took the top spot in the group by beating West Germany 8–8 (64–63 on touches) while the United States finished last after losing to Sweden 9–2.

Round 1 Pool D 

In the first set of matches, Italy beat Japan 9–2 and Hungary defeated South Korea 9–6. The second set saw the winners both win again (securing advancement) and the losers both lose again (resulting in elimination), as Italy prevailed over South Korea 9–5 and Hungary won against Japan 9–5. Finally, Italy took the top spot in the group by beating Hungary 9–6 while Japan finished last after losing to South Korea 9–4.

Elimination rounds

References

Foil team
Men's events at the 1988 Summer Olympics